Brassia aurantiaca is a species of orchid. It is native to Colombia, Ecuador and Venezuela.

References

External links
 
 

aurantiaca
Orchids of Colombia
Orchids of Ecuador
Orchids of Venezuela
Plants described in 1853